Gyan Ganga Institute of Technology and Sciences  is a professional institution in  Jabalpur, Madhya Pradesh, India.  It was founded in 2003

GGITS offers bachelor's and master's degrees, and diplomas in engineering, pharmacy, and management. It is affiliated to Rajiv Gandhi Praudyogiki  Vishwavidyalaya and is accredited by the National Board of Accreditation of the All India Council for Technical Education.

GGITS is part of the Gyan Ganga Group of Institutions

Description 
GGITS has over 60 lecture theatres, 23 tutorial rooms, 13 seminar halls, 3 workshops, 7 drawing halls, 2 auditoriums, multiple sports grounds and an amphitheater. It supports the Swachh Bharat Mission.  The central library has a total of more than 6000 titles and over 55000 volumes of books.

GGITS has had more than 100 chancellor awardees and over 20 GATE qualifiers every year. In Smart India Hackathon, 2019, organised by MHRD, AICTE, a 36 hour long product-building competition,  GGITS has won the 1st rank 5 times with 5 different teams.

Technical training, professional training, vocational training, and academic English education are all offered by GGITS in addition to teaching. Student-run clubs in welfare, sports, literature, technical, and cultural pursuits have been launched by GGITS. A seven-day tech festival called Utsav is also held at the institution.

External links
Official website

Engineering colleges in Madhya Pradesh
Education in Jabalpur
Educational institutions established in 2003
2003 establishments in Madhya Pradesh